The Estadio Olímpico General José Antonio Anzoátegui before called Estadio Luis Ramos, is a stadium located in the Venezuelan city of Puerto la Cruz, in the state of Anzoátegui. It was opened on December 8, 1965 by the former president of Venezuela, Raúl Leoni.

Overview

The old stadium that occupied the area was demolished and construction for a new stadium started from scratch. A modern stadium was needed to be a venue for the Copa America 2007 soccer tournament. The stadium has a spectator capacity of 37,485 with multiple levels, a closed circuit security system, two police stations inside the stadium, four locker rooms, four temporal offices, an office for the Venezuelan Federation of football and another one for FIFA, an anti-doping room, two changing rooms for athletes, a gym, an auditorium for 200 people, eight food shops, a central control station, a nursery, a roof for the locations of television cameras, restaurant and a VIP Bar, four elevators and 24 transmission cabins.

In July 2006, the Legislative branch of Anzoátegui approved 25 hundred million bolivares to speed up the works of the stadium in which have been invested 100 million bolivares.

After the Copa América 2007 finished, the stadium started works on the final touches of the stadium. In March 2008, the roof was finally finished.

Copa América 2007 
The stadium was one of the venues for the Copa America 2007. 
The following tournament games were played at the stadium:

Concerts 
The following is an incomplete list of known foreign artists who have given concerts in the stadium:

References

External links

Football venues in Venezuela
Copa América stadiums
Sport in Puerto la Cruz
Buildings and structures in Anzoátegui
Buildings and structures in Barcelona, Venezuela
Sports venues completed in 1965
1965 establishments in Venezuela
Athletics (track and field) venues in Venezuela